Ruben O. Niebla (born December 19, 1971), is an American former professional baseball pitcher and current  pitching coach for the San Diego Padres of Major League Baseball (MLB). He formerly served as the assistant pitching coach for the Cleveland Indians.

Career
Niebla attended Calexico High School in Calexico, California and Azusa Pacific University.

A pitcher, Niebla played in minor league baseball from 1995 to 2000 with teams in the Montreal Expos and Los Angeles Dodgers organizations and in independent baseball leagues. Niebla was with the Cleveland Indians Organization since 2001, as a coach at multiple levels of the organization. In 2010, he was a Major League Coaching Assistant for the Indians. On August 9, 2012, the Cleveland Indians fired pitching coach Scott Radinsky and named Niebla the interim pitching coach for the remainder of the 2012 season. Niebla served as the Indians minor league Pitching Coordinator from 2013 through the 2019 season. Niebla was named the Indians' assistant pitching coach on October 31, 2019. 

Niebla was hired as the San Diego Padres pitching coach on October 27, 2021.

References

External links 

1971 births
Living people
Albuquerque Dukes players
American expatriate baseball players in Canada
Azusa Pacific University alumni
Baseball coaches from California
Baseball players from California
Baseball pitchers
Chico Heat players
Cleveland Indians coaches
Corpus Christi Barracudas players
Harrisburg Senators players
Jupiter Hammerheads players
Laredo Apaches players
Major League Baseball pitching coaches
Minor league baseball coaches
Ottawa Lynx players
Palm Springs Suns players
People from Calexico, California
Reno Blackjacks players
San Antonio Missions players
San Bernardino Stampede players
Tri-City Posse players
Vero Beach Dodgers players